Jacques Michel Gabriel Paul Benoist-Méchin (1 July 1901 – 24 February 1983) was a French far right politician and writer. He was born and died in Paris. Well known as a journalist and historian, he later became prominent for his collaborationism under the Vichy regime. After his conviction in 1947 and release from prison in 1954, he became an Arab world expert in the second part of his life.

Early years
Benoist-Méchin was educated at leading schools in Switzerland and the United Kingdom as well as the Lycée Louis-le-Grand before attending the Sorbonne. He subsequently served in the French Army, spending the period from 1921 to 1923 as part of the forces involved in the occupation of the Rhineland. He then became a journalist, working for the International News Service from 1924 to 1927 and was appointed editor of L'Europe Nouvelle in 1930 by Louise Weiss.

Political career
A critic of democracy, Benoist-Méchin joined the French Popular Party in 1936. A noted Germanophile, he joined the Comité France-Allemagne, a group dedicated to fostering closer links between the two countries. Despite this his earlier military service meant that when war broke out between the two countries in 1939 he was mobilised and during the Battle of France he was captured and for a time held as a prisoner of war in Voves. He was quickly freed however and served as chief of the POWs diplomatic mission to Berlin, aimed at securing the release of those held in Germany.

In the main the Germanophile Benoist-Méchin somewhat welcomed the German occupation of France during World War II. He served as an undersecretary in François Darlan's cabinet and, along with Pierre Pucheu and Paul Marion, became part of the so-called "young cyclists" group of pro-German Darlan loyalists. The 11 May 1941, he accompanied Darlan to Berchtesgaden in order to negotiate military facilities in Syria for Germany with Hitler. In early 1942 he received from his personal friend Otto Abetz an offer that would guarantee France effective independence if the country agreed to become a military ally of Germany, although when the offer was officially made the terms had been watered down somewhat. Despite this loss of face Benoist-Méchin was an enthusiastic collaborator who claimed that France was working with Germany rather than opposing her and risking further defeat or working for her and thus becoming subservient. He was briefly the official ambassador for the collaborationist government in occupied Paris although early on this role passed to fellow Germanophile Fernand de Brinon.

A minister without portfolio in Vichy France, Benoist-Méchin's influence grew when he, along with his allies Paul Marion and Joseph Darnand, was appointed to the controlling committee of the Légion des Volontaires Français in June 1942. In this position he suggested renaming the group Légion Tricolore and converting it into a professional military unit, an idea soon adopted. Increasingly sidelined by Pierre Laval, Benoist-Méchin was involved in plotting with Darnand and Jacques Doriot for the three men to form a pro-Nazi triumvirate to administer Vichy France but the plan came to nothing.

He was arrested in September 1944 for his role as collaborator. His trial began on 9 May 1947 before the High Court of Justice. He was accused of tactical and strategic collaboration with the enemy. On 6 June, Benoist-Méchin was sentenced to death and indignité nationale. He was pardoned on 30 July by President Vincent Auriol and on 6 August his death sentence was commuted to life imprisonment and later to 20 years. He benefited from a remission of sentence 24 September 1953 and was released on parole in November 1954, when he was freed from Clairvaux.

Immediately before and following his release Benoist-Méchin wrote for a number of right-wing journals, notably Écrits de Paris and Paroles Françaises, the organ of the Republican Party of Liberty. He was a member of the Union des Intellectuels Indépendants, along with the likes of Pierre-Antoine Cousteau, and was co-patron with Maurice Bardèche of L'Union Réaliste, a group that sought to glorify the Vichy years.

Writing
As a writer he produced a History of the German Army in ten volumes whilst De la Défaite au désastre, his memoirs of the collaboration period, was published in 1984. His 1941 work La Moisson de Quarante was an earlier memoir, specifically concerned with his time as a POW, whilst he would later write an interpretation of Adolf Hitler's Mein Kampf. Before the war he had been most noted as an Arabist and was a prominent admirer of Ibn Saud.

Personal life
Benoist-Méchin was a patron of the famous Paris bookshop Shakespeare and Company and during the Second World War used his connections to secure the release of the shop's American-born owner Sylvia Beach from a spell of internment. He befriended James Joyce and made an early French translation of Molly Bloom's monologue from Ulysses, and also provided the musical transcription of "Little Harry Hughes" photographed for episode 17. He also corresponded with Ernst Jünger during the German scholar's residence in occupied France. He also developed a close friendship with Union Movement leader Oswald Mosley whilst the latter lived in France after the war.

Publications 
 Histoire de l'armée allemande (1936) :
 :  De l'Armée impériale à la Reichswehr (1918–1919) ;
 :  De la Reichswehr à l'Armée nationale (1919–1938) ;
 :  De Vienne à Prague (1938–1939).
 Éclaircissements sur Mein Kampf d'Adolphe Hitler, le livre qui a changé la face du monde (1939).
 La Moisson de quarante – Journal d’un prisonnier de guerre (1941).
 L'Ukraine, des origines à Staline (Albin Michel, 1941).
 Ce qui demeure – Lettres de soldats tombés au champ d’honneur, 1914–1918 (1942).
 Série du Rêve le plus long de l'Histoire (Éditions Perrin ou Tempus pour la collection de Poche) :
 : Lawrence d'Arabie – Le rêve fracassé (1961), existe aussi en collection de poche depuis 2008 ;
 : Cléopâtre – Le rêve évanoui (1964) ;
 : Bonaparte en Égypte – Le rêve inassouvi (La guilde du livre 1966, Lausanne ; Perrin, 1978) ;
 : Lyautey l'Africain ou Le rêve immolé (1966) ;
 : L'empereur Julien – Le rêve calciné (1969) ;
 : Alexandre le Grand – Le rêve dépassé (1976). Également Ed. Clairefontaine et La guilde du livre Lausanne, 1964 ;
 : Frédéric de Hohenstaufen – Le rêve excommunié (1980), existe aussi en collection de poche depuis 2008.
 Le Loup et le Léopard :
 : Mustapha Kemal – La mort d’un Empire (1954) ;
 : Ibn Séoud – La naissance d’un Royaume (1955) ;
 : Le Roi Saud, ou l'Orient à l'heure des relèves (1960).
 Soixante jours qui ébranlèrent l'occident (1956). Published abridged in one volume in English as 60 days that shook the West (one volume, Jonathan Cape, 1963).
 : La Bataille du Nord – 10 mai-4 juin 1940 ;
 : La Bataille de France – 4 juin 1940– 25 juin 1940 ;
 : La Fin du Régime – 26 juin 1940 – 10 juillet 1940.
 Un printemps arabe (1959).
 Deux étés africains (1972).
 À destins rompus (1974).
 Fayçal, roi d'Arabie (1975).
 L'Homme et ses jardins – Les métamorphoses du paradis terrestre (1975).
 La Musique et l'immortalité dans l'œuvre de Marcel Proust (1977).
 La Turquie se Dévoile 1908–1938 (1980).
 De la défaite au désastre (1984–1985, posthume).
 À l'épreuve du temps (1989–1993, posthume) (Nouvelle édition revisité en 1 seul tome paru en mai 2011 chez Perrin).
 Histoire des Alaouites (1994, posthume).

References

Cited sources

1901 births
1983 deaths
Writers from Paris
French collaborators with Nazi Germany
French Popular Party politicians
French memoirists
French military personnel of World War II
LGBT conservatism
French LGBT writers
20th-century French politicians
20th-century French writers
20th-century French male writers
Prisoners sentenced to death by France
French prisoners sentenced to death
Burials at Père Lachaise Cemetery
University of Paris alumni
World War II prisoners of war held by Germany
20th-century French historians
Winners of the Prix Broquette-Gonin (literature)
French male non-fiction writers
French politicians convicted of crimes
French LGBT politicians
Legion of French Volunteers Against Bolshevism
20th-century French journalists
20th-century memoirists
French expatriates in Switzerland
French expatriates in the United Kingdom
20th-century French LGBT people